The Astronauts (Polish: Astronauci) is the first science fiction novel by Polish writer Stanisław Lem published as a book, in 1951.

To write the novel, Lem received advance payment from publishing house Czytelnik (Warsaw). The book became an instant success and was translated into several languages (first into Czech, which was published in 1956). This success convinced Lem to switch to the career of a science-fiction author.

The Astronauts, written for the youth, is set in the Communist utopian future. To get it published under the communist regime in Poland, Lem had to insert frequent references to the ideals of communism. Decades later, Lem declared about The Astronauts:

The inability to ever understand alien civilizations, a frequent theme of Lem's future works, appears here for the first time.

Plot summary

The introduction describes the fall of the Tunguska meteorite (1908) and the subsequent expedition of Leonid Kulik. The hypothesis about the crash of a spaceship is mentioned.

Fast-forward to the year 2003. Communism has emerged as the worldwide form of government and humankind, freed from oppression and  chaos, is engaged in gigantic engineering projects such as irrigation of the Sahara, construction of a hydro-energetic plant over the Strait of Gibraltar, and the ability to control the climate. The latest project is to thaw the Antarctic and Arctic regions by artificial nuclear-powered "suns" circling above.

During the preparation of earthworks in the Tunguska area, a strange object is found and later identified as an extraterrestrial data record. The record contains details about the travel of a spaceship from Venus (which crashed in Tunguska) and the data record ends with an ominous message: "After two rotations the Earth will be radiated. When the radiation intensity drops to half, the Great Movement will commence." Scared, the government of the Earth (consisting of scientists) decides to send a newly built spaceship, the Kosmokrator (equipped with a vacuum tube-based computer called Marax) to Venus.

After a few weeks, the international crew of the Kosmokrator arrives on Venus but finds no traces of life, only strange, half-destroyed technological structures like the "White Globe", a giant anti-gravity device.

It turns out that Venus was inhabited by a warlike civilization planning to occupy the Earth. However, before they managed to destroy life on Earth, they themselves perished in a nuclear civil war, leaving only ruins of cities and scattered electronic records.

Is noteworthy that narrator of the large part of the book is Kosmokrator's pilot, Robert Smith, himalaist (former participant of Khangchendzonga expedition), with African-American roots.

Film adaptations
In 1960 the film Der Schweigende Stern (The Silent Star, Milcząca Gwiazda in Polish), based on the novel, was shot in East Germany and was directed by Kurt Maetzig.  Lem was extremely critical of the film. In 1962 a shortened, 79 minute version of the film was released in the United States by Crown International Pictures; it was dubbed into English and carried the title First Spaceship on Venus.

Analysis 
In order to appease the communist censors, Lem had to include some "ideologically correct" content; which in the case of this novel include a mention that Venusian civilization's destructruction was a result of capitalism.

Footnotes

External links
 List of published Lem's novels in all languages
 
 Astronauts book page on Stanisław Lem's official site

1951 novels
Novels by Stanisław Lem
Novels set on Venus
Novels first published in serial form
Works originally published in Polish magazines
1951 science fiction novels
Space exploration novels
Czytelnik books
Polish novels
Fiction set in 1908
Fiction set in 2003